Fabián Agustín Dávila Silva (born 5 January 1999) is a Uruguayan professional footballer who plays as a forward for Boston River.

Club career
Dávila is a youth academy graduate of Peñarol. On 31 August 2017, Spanish club Real Sociedad announced the signing of Dávila on a two-year long loan deal with an option to buy. On 3 February 2018, Dávila made his debut for club's reserve team Real Sociedad B which plays in Segunda División B, the third tier of Spanish football league system. He came on as an 81st-minute substitute for Marcos Celorrio in his team's 1–0 win against SD Amorebieta.

Dávila returned to Peñarol after the expiry of loan deal, as the Basque-based side decided not to activate his purchase option. On 6 October 2019, he made his professional debut in Peñarol's 1–0 away loss against Liverpool Montevideo.

In August 2021, Dávila terminated his contract with Peñarol and joined Boston River.

International career
Dávila is a former Uruguay youth international. He was part of under-20 team which finished third at 2019 South American U-20 Championship.

Personal life
Dávila is the grandson of Walkir Silva, who notably scored Peñarol's second goal in their 2–0 win against Aston Villa in 1982 Intercontinental Cup.

Honours

Club
Liverpool Montevideo
Supercopa Uruguaya: 2020

International
Uruguay U20
South American Youth Football Championship third place: 2019

References

External links
 

1999 births
Living people
People from Rivera Department
Association football forwards
Uruguayan footballers
Uruguay youth international footballers
Uruguay under-20 international footballers
Uruguayan Primera División players
Peñarol players
Real Sociedad B footballers
Liverpool F.C. (Montevideo) players
Boston River players
Uruguayan expatriate footballers
Uruguayan expatriate sportspeople in Spain
Expatriate footballers in Spain